Magnolia cristalensis is a species of plant in the family Magnoliaceae, described by Johannes Bisse in 1974. It is native to Cuba.

References

cristalensis
Flora of Cuba
Plants described in 1974
Flora without expected TNC conservation status